Holly Weston is an English actress. She is known for her role as Ash Kane in the British television soap opera Hollyoaks. Weston also played the lead roles in feature films Filth and Wisdom and Splintered.

Early life
Weston was born in Putney, London, England. Weston began acting as a child. She trained in dance at the Urdang Academy, she also trained in acting at the Anna Scher Theatre before training at the Mountview Academy of Theatre Arts. After Weston was cast in Hollyoaks she relocated to Liverpool where the serial is filmed.

Career
In 2003 Weston appeared in Mouth to Mouth as Claire. Weston was later cast as the lead role in Filth and Wisdom, which was the directorial debut of Madonna. She played Holly, a ballet dancer working as a stripper and pole dancer. The film was initially planned to be a short film, but as it was filmed it became a feature-length film. Weston was later cast in the lead role in horror film Splintered, in which she played teenager Sophie. Weston has also appeared in film Mouth to Mouth as Claire before appearing as the corpse of Carter's wife in John Carter.

Weston has also appeared as Grace in Harley Street, as Sadie in Law & Order: UK, as Fleur in Off the Hook, as Kelly Robe in Wall of Silence, as Julie in Killing Time, Leah in White Heat and as Lara Stone in The Impressions Show.

On 5 September 2011 it was announced that Weston had been cast in a regular role in Hollyoaks as Ash Kane. Weston said she was initially signed to a six-month contract, which was a "trial period". Producers then decided to keep the character on. For her portrayal of Ash, Weston was nominated for "Best Actress" at the 2012 British Soap Awards. She later received a "Best Actress" nomination at the 2012 TV Choice Awards.

Weston has also done voice-over work and appeared in the music videos for "Lonely Girl" by Sandi Thom and "The Test" by Chemical Brothers.

Filmography

References

External links

People from Putney
Living people
1985 births
English film actresses
Actresses from London
English soap opera actresses
Alumni of the Mountview Academy of Theatre Arts
Alumni of the Anna Scher Theatre School